The sport of association football in the French half of the island of Saint Martin is run by the Comité de Football des Îles du Nord. The association administers the national football team, as well as the Saint-Martin Championships.

League system